The 31st Guam Legislature was a meeting of the Guam Legislature. It convened in Hagatna, Guam on January 3, 2011 and ended on January 7, 2013, during the 1st and 2nd years of Eddie Calvo's 1st Gubernatorial Term.

In the 2010 Guamanian general election, the Democratic Party of Guam won a majority of seats in the Guam Legislature.

Party Summary

Leadership

Legislative
 Speaker: Judith T.P. Won Pat
 Vice Speaker: Benjamin J.F. Cruz
 Legislative Secretary: Tina Rose Muna Barnes

Majority (Democratic)
 Majority Leader: Rory J. Respicio
 Assistant Majority Leader: Judith P. Guthertz, DPA
 Majority Whip: Tina Muna Barnes

Minority (Republican)
 Minority Leader: Frank F. Blas Jr.
 Assistant Minority Leader: Aline A. Yamashita, Ph.D.
 Minority Whip: Honorable V. Anthony Ada
 Assistant Minority Whip: Mana Silva Taijeron

Membership

Committees

References 

Legislature of Guam
Politics of Guam
Political organizations based in Guam